Cassia ferruginea is a species of flowering plant in the family Fabaceae, native to Brazil. It is used as a street tree in a number of Brazilian cities.

Subtaxa
The following varieties are accepted:
Cassia ferruginea var. ferruginea – Brazil
Cassia ferruginea var. vellozoana  – southern Brazil

References

ferruginea
Endemic flora of Brazil
Plants described in 1825